Real Estate Bank of Iraq  is an Iraqi state-owned bank aimed at facilitating housing projects through giving loans. In 1997, it started to give loans to tourism projects like building hotels. It was established in 1948 in Baghdad and started working in 1949. The bank has several branches in Baghdad and the governorates.

It is one of four special purpose banks established after the Second Gulf War.

See also
Iraqi dinar

References
 http://www.cbi.iq/index.php?pid=IraqFinancialInst&lang=en

External links
 Official Website

Companies based in Baghdad
Banks of Iraq
1948 establishments in Iraq
Banks established in 1948